Mount Spry is a small 5,720-ft elevation mountain summit made of Navajo Sandstone located in Zion National Park, in Washington County of southwest Utah, United States. Officially named in 1934, it honors William Spry (1864-1929), the third governor of Utah.  The nearest higher peak is The East Temple,  to the east. Precipitation runoff from the mountain drains into tributaries of the North Fork Virgin River.

Climbing Routes
Climbing Routes on Mount Spry

 Holy Roller -  - 5 pitches
 Swamp Donkey -  - 5 pitches
 Shark Tooth Freighter -  - 3 pitches

Climate
Spring and fall are the most favorable seasons to visit Mount Spry. According to the Köppen climate classification system, it is located in a Cold semi-arid climate zone, which is defined by the coldest month having an average mean temperature below 32 °F (0 °C), and at least 50% of the total annual precipitation being received during the spring and summer.

See also

 Geology of the Zion and Kolob canyons area
 Colorado Plateau

Gallery

References

External links
Zion National Park National Park Service
 Weather forecast: Mount Spry

Spry
Zion National Park
Spry
Spry